Winand Osiński (22 August 1913 – 11 April 2006) was a Polish long-distance runner. He competed in the marathon at the 1952 Summer Olympics.

References

1913 births
2006 deaths
Athletes (track and field) at the 1952 Summer Olympics
Polish male long-distance runners
Polish male marathon runners
Olympic athletes of Poland
People from Gladbeck
Sportspeople from Münster (region)